Jasun Wardlaw (January 25, 1973 – October 22, 2003) better known by his stage name Half a Mill, was a Brooklyn-based American rapper.

Career
Half a Mill was considered an underground rapper in the early 1990s. His mainstream breakthrough came in 1997 when he scored a guest spot on supergroup the Firm's only release, The Album.

Personal life and death
Wardlaw was shot in the head and killed in Brooklyn's Albany Projects on October 22, 2003. His body was found by police inside his apartment. He left behind a son, Jasun Jabbar Wardlaw Jr., who is a rapper and actor.

Half a Mill was the subject of the 2010 full-length documentary Player Hating: A Love Story by filmmaker Maggie Hadleigh-West.

Discography

See also
List of murdered hip hop musicians

References

1973 births
African-American male rappers
Deaths by firearm in Brooklyn
Rappers from Brooklyn
Underground rappers
2003 deaths
Gangsta rappers
Murdered African-American people
East Coast hip hop musicians
American murder victims
20th-century American male musicians
2003 murders in the United States
20th-century African-American musicians
21st-century African-American people